GALA – The Collection is a compilation album from Sarah Brightman released on 6 July in commemoration of the Japan tour, GALA - An Evening with Sarah Brightman.

The album includes leading songs in her career such as "Time to Say Goodbye (solo version)," "Nessun Dorma," "Canto Della Terra," "Stranger in Paradise," and "Pie Jesu." It features the high-fidelity SHM-CD format. It had a Japanese original release. Tracks 16-18 are bonus tracks.

Track listing

Chart performance

References

Sarah Brightman albums
Compilation albums by English artists
2016 compilation albums